Pietro Della Valle Italian School is an Italian international school in Farmanieh, a district in Shemiran, Tehran, Iran. It offers courses from kindergarten through senior high school and Italian language courses based on CEFR and CILS.

References

External links

 Pietro della Valle Italian School
  -  -  Pietro della Valle Italian School

High schools in Iran
International schools in Tehran
Italian international schools in Iran
Educational institutions with year of establishment missing